Tatiana Shishkova is a road cyclist from Moldova and Russia. She represented Moldova at the 2004 UCI Road World Championships and Russia at the 2006 UCI Road World Championships.

References

External links
 profile at Procyclingstats.com

Moldovan female cyclists
Russian female cyclists
Living people
Place of birth missing (living people)
Date of birth missing (living people)
Year of birth missing (living people)